Brenthia nephelosema is a species of moth of the family Choreutidae. It was described by Alexey Diakonoff in 1978. It is found in Fujian, China.

References

Brenthia
Moths described in 1978